A munjandie is an obsolete unit of mass in India approximately equal to 4 grains (0.259 g). After metrication in the mid-20th century, the unit became obsolete.

See also
List of customary units of measurement in South Asia

References

Units of mass
Customary units in India
Obsolete units of measurement